Somatidia halli is a species of beetle in the family Cerambycidae. It was described by Broun in 1914.

References

halli
Beetles described in 1914